KCFD (88.1 FM) is a radio station licensed to Crawford, Nebraska, United States. The station is currently owned by Southern Cultural Foundation.

References

External links
 

CFD
Crawford, Nebraska